The Denial of Death is a 1973 book by American cultural anthropologist Ernest Becker. The author builds on the works of Søren Kierkegaard, Sigmund Freud, Norman O. Brown, and Otto Rank to discuss the psychological and philosophical implications of how people and cultures have reacted to the concept of death. The author argues most human action is taken to ignore or avoid the inevitability of death. It was awarded the Pulitzer Prize for General Nonfiction in 1974, two months after the author's death. It is the main work responsible for the development of terror management theory.

Table of Contents 

Preface
Chapter One: Introduction: Human Nature and the Heroic
PART I: THE DEPTH PSYCHOLOGY OF HEROISM
Chapter Two: The Terror of Death
Chapter Three: The Recasting of Some Basic Psychoanalytic Ideas
Chapter Four: Human Character as a Vital Lie
Chapter Five: The Psychoanalyst Kierkegaard
Chapter Six: The Problem of Freud's Character, Noch Einmal
PART II: THE FAILURES OF HEROISM
Chapter Seven: The Spell Cast by Persons - The Nexus of Unfreedom
Chapter Eight: Otto Rank and the Closure of Psychoanalysis on Kierkegaard
Chapter Nine: The Present Outcome of Psychoanalysis
Chapter Ten: A General View of Mental Illness
PART III: REROSPECT AND CONCLUSION: THE DILEMMAS OF HEROISM 
Chapter Eleven: Psychology and Religion: What Is the Heroic Individual?
References
Index

Note: beginning with the 1997 printing, subsequent editions include a new “Foreword” by Sam Keen

Background
The premise of The Denial of Death is that human civilization is ultimately an elaborate, symbolic defense mechanism against the knowledge of our mortality, which in turn acts as the emotional and intellectual response to our basic survival mechanism. Becker argues that a basic duality in human life exists between the physical world of objects and biology, and a symbolic world of human meaning. Thus, since humanity has a dualistic nature consisting of a physical self and a symbolic self, we are able to transcend the dilemma of mortality by focusing our attention mainly on our symbolic selves, i.e. our culturally-based self esteem, which Becker calls “heroism”: a “defiant creation of meaning” expressing “the myth of the significance of human life” as compared to other animals.

This symbolic self-focus takes the form of an individual's "causa sui project," (sometimes called an “immortality project,” or a “heroism project”). A person’s "causa sui project” acts as their immortality vessel, whereby a person creates meaning, or continues to create meaning, beyond their own life-span. By being part of symbolic constructs with more significance and longevity than one’s body—cultural activities and beliefs—one can gain a sense of legacy or (in the case of religion) an afterlife. In other words, by living up to (or especially exceeding) cultural standards, people feel they can become part of something eternal: something that will never die as compared to their physical body. This, in turn, gives people the feeling that their lives have meaning, a purpose, and significance in the grand scheme of things i.e. that they are “heroic contributors to world life” engaged in an “immortality project.”

Immortality projects are one way that people manage death anxiety. Some people, however, will engage in hedonic pursuits like drugs, alcohol, and entertainment to escape their death anxiety - often to compensate for a lack of “heroism” or culturally-based self-esteem - resulting in a lack of contribution to the “immortality project”. Others will try to manage the terror of death by “tranquilizing themselves with the trivial” i.e. strongly focusing on trivial matters and exaggerating their importance — often through busyness and frenetic activity. Becker describes the current prevalence of hedonism and triviality as a result of the downfall of religious worldviews such as Christianity that could take “slaves, cripples... imbeciles... the simple and the mighty” and allow them all to accept their animal nature in the context of a spiritual reality and an afterlife.

Humanity's traditional "hero-systems", such as religion, are no longer convincing in the age of reason. Becker argues that the loss of religion leaves humanity with impoverished resources for necessary illusions. Science attempts to serve as an immortality project, something that Becker believes it can never do because it is unable to provide agreeable, absolute meanings to human life. The book states that we need new convincing "illusions" that enable us to feel heroic in ways that are agreeable. Becker, however, does not provide any definitive answer, mainly because he believes that there is no perfect solution. Instead, he hopes that gradual realization of humanity's innate motivations, namely death, can help to bring about a better world.

Becker argues that the conflict between contradictory immortality projects (particularly in religion) is a wellspring for the violence and misery in the world caused by wars, genocide, racism, nationalism and so forth since immortality projects that contradict one another threaten one’s core beliefs and sense of security.

Some concepts and ideas

Mental Illness
Becker concludes Part II with "A General View of Mental Illness" (Chapter 10). Here Becker offers a summary observation that "mental illness represents styles of bogging-down in the denial of creatureliness" that is part and parcel of immortality projects.

Depression
At one extreme, people experiencing depression have the sense that their immortality project is failing. They either begin to think the immortality project is false or feel unable to successfully be a hero in terms of that immortality project. As a result, they are consistently reminded of their mortality, biological body, and feelings of worthlessness.

Schizophrenia
At the other extreme, Becker describes schizophrenia as a state in which a person becomes so obsessed with his or her personal immortality project as to altogether deny the nature of all other realities. Schizophrenics create their own internal, mental reality in which they define and control all purposes, truths, and meanings. This makes them pure heroes, living in a mental reality that is taken as superior to both physical and cultural realities.

Creativity
Like the schizophrenic, creative and artistic individuals deny both physical reality and culturally-endorsed immortality projects, expressing a need to create their own reality. The primary difference is that creative individuals have talents that allow them to create and express a reality that others may appreciate, rather than simply constructing an internal, mental reality.

Reception and influence

The Denial of Death has been praised for its post-Freudian approach to psychoanalysis, and has been criticized for its reductive depictions of mental health and humanity.

The book helped to inspire a revival of interest in the work of the Austrian psychoanalyst Otto Rank.

The book has also had a wide cultural impact beyond the fields of psychology and philosophy. The book made an appearance in Woody Allen's film Annie Hall, when the death-obsessed character Alvy Singer buys it for his girlfriend Annie. It was referred to by Spalding Gray in his work It's a Slippery Slope. Former United States President Bill Clinton quoted The Denial of Death in his 2004 autobiography My Life; he also included it as one of 21 titles in his list of favorite books. The playwright Ayad Akhtar mentions it in his Pulitzer Prize-winning play Disgraced.

The book was an inspiration to Mark Manson when he was writing his bestseller The Subtle Art of Not Giving a F*ck (2016): “from the very first outline” (says Manson), “I knew the last chapters would be about death and that Becker would be a big part of it.”

See also
Flight from Death
The Hero with a Thousand Faces
Death anxiety
Human condition
Memento mori
Terror management theory
Uncanny valley
Existentialism

References

External links

The Ernest Becker Foundation 
Summary of the book
 Intro to Ernest Becker's ideas

1973 non-fiction books
American non-fiction books
Books about death
Books about psychoanalysis
Books by Ernest Becker
English-language books
Free Press (publisher) books
Pulitzer Prize for General Non-Fiction-winning works